"We'll Meet Again" is a 1939 song by English singer Vera Lynn with music and lyrics composed and written by English songwriters Ross Parker and Hughie Charles. The song is one of the most famous of the Second World War era, and resonated with soldiers going off to fight as well as their families and loved ones.

The song was published by Michael Ross Limited, whose directors included Louis Carris, Ross Parker and Norman Keen. Keen, an English pianist also collaborated with Parker and Hughie Charles on "We'll Meet Again" and many other songs published by the company, including "There'll Always Be an England" and "I'm In Love For The Last Time". The song's original recording featured Lynn accompanied by Arthur Young on Novachord (an early synthesizer), while a rerecording in 1953 featured a more lavish instrumentation and a chorus of British Armed Forces personnel.

The song gave its name to the 1943 musical film We'll Meet Again in which Lynn played the lead role (see 1943 in music). Lynn's 1953 recording is featured in the final scene of Stanley Kubrick's 1964 film Dr. Strangelove – with a bitter irony, as the song accompanies a nuclear holocaust that wipes out humanity. It was also used in the closing scenes of the 1986 BBC television serial The Singing Detective. British director John Schlesinger used the song in his 1979 World War II film Yanks, which is about British citizens and American soldiers during the military buildup in the UK as the Allies prepare for the Normandy landings.

During the Cold War, Lynn's recording was included in the package of music and programmes held in 20 underground radio stations of the BBC's Wartime Broadcasting Service (WTBS), designed to provide public information and morale-boosting broadcasts for 100 days after a nuclear attack. The song reached number 29 on the U.S. charts.  Lynn sang the song in London on the 60th anniversary of VE Day in 2005.

In April 2020, a charity duet with Katherine Jenkins, released in 2014, reached number 72 on the UK Singles Chart, with proceeds going to National Health Service charities. In May 2020 following the 75th Anniversary celebrations of VE Day, the solo version by Lynn also reached number 55 in the UK chart.

Cultural impact
 The song has been credited as one of the first to make use of the Hammond Novachord, the first polyphonic synthesizer
 Traditionally, this song is played on 5 May as a closure to the Liberation Day Concert in Amsterdam, to mark the end of World War II in the Netherlands, as the monarch leaves the concert on a canal boat.
 The final episode of the The Colbert Report featured Stephen Colbert and several celebrities, musicians, and other friends of the show singing the song.
 In the series finale of Gravity Falls, the main villain, Bill Cipher sang the song to Stanford Pines to mock him. Since then, the song has been frequently associated with Gravity Falls and Bill's character.
On 5 April 2020, Queen Elizabeth II referenced the song in a rare and ultimately final televised address that aired to Britain and the Commonwealth, where she expressed her gratitude for the efforts people are taking to mitigate the COVID-19 pandemic virus and acknowledged the severe challenges being faced by families across the world. The reference spurred covers by West End theatre stars with Lynn and Katherine Jenkins with Lynn, just some months before Lynn died. Jenkins' version was released on iTunes as a benefit for the NHS Charities Together.
 The song is referenced in the song "Vera" on the Pink Floyd album The Wall.
 The song is featured in the video game Far Cry 5. The song is hummed by one of the villains and also appears in the credits sequence, depending upon the ending chosen by the player.

References

1939 songs
British patriotic songs
Katherine Jenkins songs
Pop ballads
Quotations from music
Songs about parting
Songs of World War II
Songs written by Ross Parker (songwriter)
Vera Lynn songs
1930s neologisms